Karatina is a town in Nyeri County, Kenya. It hosts a municipal council and the headquarters of Mathira East district. Karatina municipality has a total population of 6,852, all classified as urban (1999 census). It has six electoral wards, all in the Mathira Constituency; the remaining five wards of Mathira constituency represent Nyeri County Council.

Geography
Karatina is on the Nairobi – Nyeri highway, 25 kilometres southeast of Nyeri town and south of Mount Kenya.

History
Karatina was a popular open air market before colonial period, barter trade took place under a  muratina tree, hence the name Karatina. During World War II a dried vegetable factory was built in Karatina, providing the people with dried fruits. other people think the town's name came from the English name ' quarantine ' that locals pronounced as 'karantina'.

Health
There are two major hospitals in Karatina, the government-funded Karatina General Hospital and the private Jamii Hospital. In addition, PCEA TumuTumu Hospital is a few miles west of Karatina.

Economy
Karatina town hosts the largest open air market in Kenya and the People living in Karatina are known to be very active with most economic operations beginning at 4am and ending at 10pm. More than 90% are Kikuyus which form the largest tribe in Kenya. There are many auxiliary services and the town is rich in agricultural products are well. There is an ideal mix of urban and rural life.

In 2017 one of the Uchumi Supermarkets branch got shut down in Karatina.

In 2018, Maguna brand of supermarkets opened 2 Supermarkets within the town. The town also plays host to another supermarket; Maathai Supermarket. 
There is huge potential for agricultural based industries which is yet to be exploited.

With the resumption of railway transport and the completion of Kenol-Marua super highway many investors are lining up to relocate to Karatina.

Schools and universities
Kanyama Secondary School
Karatina University
Karatina DEB Primary School
Kirigu Primary School
Ruthagati High School
Kirimara high school

References

Nyeri County
Populated places in Central Province (Kenya)